

Canadian Heads of Posts Abroad from 1880

A 
Adam, David
Alexander, Christopher
Allard, Hector
Allard-Gomez, Stéphanie
Allen, Jon
Amyot, Léopold Henri
Anderson, Allan Cunningham
Anderson, Admiral John R.
Anderson, Raymond Cecil
Andrew, Arthur Julian
Andreychuk, A. Raynell
Andrigo, Robert
Angell, David
April, Serge
Arcand, Théodore Jean
Archibald, Ruth
Armstrong, Dorothy Jane
Arnould, Derek Clement
Asselin, Jacques J.A.
Asselin, Pierre Léon Gérard

B 
Bacon, Terence Charles
Bailey, Mark
Baillargeon, Claude
Balloch, Howard
Barban, Gaston
Barker, James Rollins
Barrette, Hon. Antonio
Bartleman, James Karl
Barton, William Hickson
Bassett, Charles Philip
Baudouin, Daniel Georges Marc
Bauer, William Edward
Beauchemin, Marie-Andrée
Beaulieu, Paul André
Beaulne, Joseph Charles Léonard Yvon
Beaulne, Philippe
Beck, Stefanie
Bédard, Charles Michel (1924-2013)
Beesley, John Alan
Belcher, J.R.
Bélec, Jacques
Bélisle, J. Denis
Bell, John Peter
Bell, Michael Dougall
Bell, Michael Richard
Bell, Roderick
Bellemare, Edward Ritchie
Belliveau, Richard
Benson, Hon. Edgar J.
Bergbusch, Eric John
Berger, David
Berlis, Norman Frederick Henderson
Bernard-Meunier, Marie
Bernier, Gilles
Best, James Calbert
Bezanson, Keith Arthur
Bild, M. Fred
Binns, Pat
Biolik, Anna
Birkett, Charles Blair
Bissett, James Byron
Bissonnet, Alfred Pike
Bissonnette, Pierre-André
Black, Eldon Pattyson
Blackwell, Adam
Blake, Roy William
Blanchette, Arthur Edward
Blouin, Georges-Henri
Bobiash, Donald
Bobinski, Edward Lucien
Boehm, Peter
Bogdan, Angela
Bolduc, Jean-Pierre
Bones, Alan
Booth, Brig. Charles Steven
Bouchard, Hon. Benoît
Bouchard, Lucien
Boucher, Claude
Boulanger, Yves
Bourcier, Anne-Marie
Bow, Malcolm Norman
Bower, Richard Plant
Bowker, Alan
Boyd, Alan Robb
Brady, Philip Francis
Brady, Sean
Brault, Marc
Briand, Denis
Bridle, Paul Augustus
Britton, James Clelland
Broadbridge, Arthur Frederick
Brodeur, Yves
Brossard, Jacques Edmond
Brown, Harry Leslie
Brown, John Clemence Gordon
Brown, Kenneth Charles
Browne, Dean John
Browne, Dennis Brian
Bruce, Geoffrey Franklin
Bruce, Hon. Robert Randolph
Bruchési, Jean
Buckley-Jones, Martha Dilys
Bugailiskis, Alexandra
Buick, Glen Garvie James David
Bujold, Marius Jean
Bull, Roger Anthony
Bull, William Frederick
Burbridge, Kenneth Joseph
Burchell, Charles Jost
Burney, Derek Hudson
Bursey, Morley Byron
Butler, Bertram Charles
Butler, Esmond Unwin

C 
Cadieux, Hon. Joseph Alphonse Léo
Cadieux, Marcel
Cadieux, Michel
Calcott, Michael
Calderwood, Perry
Cameron, Robert Parke
Campbell, Arthur Grant
Campbell, Donald Wilfred
Campbell, Gerald K.
Campbell, Peter George Raoul
Campbell, Ross
Campeau, Arthur
Cappe, Mel
Careau, Michel Antonin
Carin, Barry
Caron, Joseph
Carruthers, Clive Alexander
Carter, Harry Havilland
Carter, Thomas Lemesurier (-2005)
Cartwright, Susan M.W.
Cavell, Reginald George
Chapdelaine, Joseph Marc Antoine Jean
Charbonneau, Yvon
Charland, Claude Talbot
Charles, Margaret Anne
Charpentier, Fulgence
Charpentier, Pierre Edgar Joseph
Charpentier, Wilfrid Joseph Georges
Châtillon, Claude Charles-Edouard
Cheney, Donald Harry
Chevrier, Hon. Lionel
Chipman, Warwick Fielding
Chistoff, Oleg Alec
Choquette, Robert
Chowdhury, Sanjeev
Chrétien, Raymond A.J.
Christie, Keith
Christie, Loring Cheney
Clark, Frank Borden
Clark, Graeme C.
Clark, Ian C.
Clark, Lorne Sheldon
Clark, Merrill G.
Clark, Robert G.
Clark, Robert Wilfred
Clark, Robert William
Clarke, William L.
Clement, Sherine W
Cleveland, John Harrison
Cole, Douglas Seaman
Coleman, Ephraim Herbert
Colfer, Terence
Collacott, David Martin
Collett, Wilmer James
Collette, Robert
Collin, Paul-André
Collins, David
Collins, Ralph Edgar
Comeau, Denis
Cook, Geoffrey Cassels
Cook, James Murray
Cook, Kenneth Murray
Cooper, James Edward
Cooper, Percy Stewart
Copithorne, Maurice D.
Cornett, Donald Macalister
Cosgrave, Col. Lawrence Moore
Côté, Ernest Adolphe
Côté, Joseph Jean Martial
Couillard, Joseph Louis Eugène
Court, Charles
Cousineau, Jacques Charles Joseph
Couvrette, Joseph Gilles André
Cowan, Hector
Cox, Gordon Edwin
Crean, Gordon Gale
Crête, Jacques
Croft, Carman Millward
Cruden, Heather
Culham, Allan
Cullen, Thomas George
Cupples, Colleen Leora
Curling, Alvin

D 
Daigle, Louis-Robert
Dale, Matthew Robert Macgowan
Daley, Daniel
Dann, Abina
Davidson, Russell H.
Davis, Brian
Davis, Chester Alvin
Davis, Hon. Thomas Clayton
de Chastelain, John G.D.
de Goumois, Michel
de Kerckhove, Ferry
de Lorimier, Louis
de Salaberry, Michel
De Silva, Gitane
Délisle, Jean-Louis
Delouya, Ariel
Delvoie, Louis André
Delworth, William Thomas
Demers, Clovis
Demers, Jacques
Denault, Jacques D.E.
Déry, Jean-Marie Gaétan
des Rivières, Geneviève
De Silva, Gitane
Desjardins, Robert
Desloges, Christine
Després, Arsène A.
Désy, Jean
Deyell, John
Dickenson, Lawrence T.
Dickson, Brian
Dier, Ormond Wilson
Dingledine, Paul S.
Dion, Adèle
Dionne, Maurice
Doherty, Donald King
Donaghy, John
Donohue, Laughton
Doré, Victor
Dorrett, Reginald Hardy
Dougan, John Alpine
Doyle, Anne-Marie
Drake, Earl Gordon
Drapeau, Jean
Drew, Hon. George Alexander
Dubé, Roxanne
Dubois, Andrée
Dubois, Paul
Duder, Rudolf
Dudoit, Alain
Duguay, Gilles Horace J.
Duhamel, Roger
Dumas, Pierre
Dupuis, Jacques Jean Couillard
Dupuy, Michel
Dupuy, Pierre
Durand, Paul D.
Dussault, Bernard
Dussault, Martin
Duval, Jean-Marc
Duval, Michel
Dymond, William A.

E 
Eaton, Fredrick S.
Eberts, Christopher Campbell
Edelstein, Verona
Edmonds, Robert Bradford
Edwards, Leonard J.
Edwards, Lucie 
Elliott, Colin Fraser
Elliott, Robert L.
Entwistle, Mark
Erichson-Brown, John Price
Etheridge, Nicholas
Eyton, Anthony Tudor
Elliott, James Angus

F 
Fabre, Hon. Hector
Faguy, Marc
Fairweather, William M.M.
Feaver, Herbert Frederick Brooks-Hill
Ferguson, Hon. George Howard
Ferguson, Ian
Filleul, Francis Miles
Fiorita, D.M.
Fogerty, Charles Douglass
Ford, Robert Arthur Douglass
Fortier, d'Iberville
Fortier, L. Yves
Fortier, Patricia
Fortin, Louise
Fournier, Jean T.
Fowler, Robert
Fox, James
Francis, Hon. Cyril Lloyd
Francis, James Ross
Fraser, Derek
Fraser, Hon. John Allen
Fraser, John MacLeod
Fraser, Scott
Frazer, Paul D.
Fréchette, Louise
Freifeld, Sidney Allan
Frenette, Réjean
Friedlaender, Lorenz
Frith, Hon. Royce
Frost, Evan Rimmer Clavell
Fulford, Dwight Wilder

G 
Gagliano, Hon. Alfonso
Gagnon, Jean-Louis
Gagnon, Yves
Gagosz, Bernard Arthur
Gallow, Charles Reid
Galt, Hon. Sir Alexander Tilloch
Garceau, Pierre Robert
Garland, Edward Joseph
Garneau, René
Gaudefroy, Henri
Gauvin, Michel
Gauvreau, Émile
Gayner, Robert Harold
Gayowsky, Nestor E.
George, James
Gervais-Vidricaire, Marie
Gherson, A. Randolph A.
Gibson, Barbara
Gibson, John Edward Guy
Gignac, Jacques Gilles Bruno
Giguère, Pierre
Gilbert, Roger Paul
Gill, Evan William Thistle
Gilmour, Eric Herbert
Girard, Raphaël
Giroux, Bernard
Glasgow, Laurette
Glass, Lester Smith
Glover, Clive Edward
Jack F. Godsell
Goldschlag, Klaus
Gooch, Stanley Edward
Goodleaf, Dan E.
Gordon, Sir Charles Blair
Gorham, Richard Vessot
Gotlieb, Allan Ezra
Goulet, Roland
Gourdeau, Henri
Graham, Arnold Kingsley
Graham, Janet
Graham, John Ware
Grande, Campbell
Grande, George Kinnear
Grant, Stewart T.
Green, Graham
Greene, Kenneth Alfred
Gregg, Brig. the Hon. Milton Fowler
Gregory, Fredericka
Grenier, Raoul Jean
Grenon, Jean-Yves
Grey, Saul
Grinius, Marius
Grondin, Gilles
Guay, Louis
Gusen, William
Guy, Henry W.

H 
Hadwen, John Gaylard
Hage, Robert
Hall, Ingrid Marianne
Halpin, Ronald
Halstead, John Gelder Horler
Hamel, Louis
Hamilton, Kevin
Hammond, Thomas Charles
Hammond, Wayne N.
Hampson, Harold George
Hancock, Peter Julian Arthur
Hanson, Samuel
Hardy, Christian
Hardy, Joseph Evremond Ghislain
Hare, Ewan Nigel
Harman, Gary Richard
Harper, Susan
Harrington, John Maurice
Harris, James Gordon
Harris, Lloyd
Hart, Albert Frederick
Hay, Harry Stewart
Haynal, George
Hearn, Godfrey Lewis
Heasman, George Robert Cawdron
Hébert, Charles Pierre
Hébert, Ernest
Heeney, Arnold Danford Patrick
Heeney, Stephen
Heinbecker, Paul
Herran-Lima, José
Herridge, Maj. the Hon. William Duncan
Hewlett-Jobes, Kathryn
Hicks, Arthur John
Hicks, Douglas Barcham
Higginbotham, John P.
Higham, Kenneth Robert
Hill, James
Hillman, Kirsten
Himelfarb, Alexander
Phillipe Hirsch
Hobson, Daniel Edward
Hoffmann, Ron
Holmes, John T.
Holmes, John Wendell
Hooper, Cleeve Francis Wilfrid
Hooton, Frank Geoffrey
Hornby, Ross
Houde, Joseph François Xavier
Hradecky, Sara
Huber, Margaret
Hubert, Jean-Paul
Hughes, Gerald Francis George
Hunt, Paul
Hurley, James Joseph
Hurtubise, Suzanne
Hutchings, David
Hutton, David
Hyndman, James Edward
Hynes, Ross

I 
Ignatieff, George
Irwin, Bissett
Irwin, John Arnold
Irwin, Rodney
Irwin, Ron
Irwin, William Arthur

J 
Jackman, Frank T.
Jackson, Robert David
Jacoby, George T.
James, Leslie Alexander Keir
Jamieson, Hon. Donald Campbell
Jarvis, William Esmond
Jay, Raymond Harry
Jenkins, William John
Jennings, Peter Rowley
Jobin, Stéphane
Johansen, Karl
Johnson, David Moffat
Johnson, Irene Elizabeth
Johnston, Peter Arthur Edward
Johnstone, Robert
Jones, Terence Stanford Ellis
Jones, William
Joubert, Pierre
Joyce, Robert K.
Juneau, Jean-Pierre
Jutzi, Bruce

K 
Kalisch, Norbert
Karsgaard, David Andrew
Kearney, John Doherty
Keenleyside, Hugh Llewellyn
Kelly, John Hall
Kergin, Michael F.
Kidd, George Pirkis
Kilpatrick, Robert Allen
Kingsley, Denis
Kinsman, Jeremy K.B.
Kirkwood, Kenneth Porter
Kirsch, Philippe
Kneale, John
Kohler, Richard
Kutz, Gwyneth

L 
Laberge, Paul-Eugène
Laflèche, Maj.-Gen. the Hon. Léo Richer
Laguë, Mario
Lalande, Joseph Ernest Gilles
Lalani, Arif
Lambert, Garrett Christopher Michael
Lambert, James
Lamontagne, Yves
Lamoureux, Hon. Lucien
Langan-Torell, Patricia
Langille, Gilbert Craig
Langley, James Coningsby
Lapointe, Christian
Lapointe, Paul André
Lapointe, Paul-Henri
Laporte, Suzanne
Larkin, Hon. Peter Charles
Latour, Cécile
Latulippe, Alain
Lau, Paul S.H.
Laughton, David Benson
Laureys, Jean François Léon Henri
Laurin, Gilbert
Laverdure, Claude
Lavertu, Gaétan
Lavigne, Joseph Walter Lorne Hunter
Lavoie, Jean-Pierre
Leach, James Darrell
Leahy, Anne
Lecoq, Richard
Lederman, Lawrence
Lee, Edward Graham
Lefebvre, Jean-Pierre
Legault, Léonard Hilarion Joseph
Léger, Jules
Léger, Louise
Leir, Michael
Lemieux, Hubert Edmond
Lemieux, Marc C.
Lessard, Gabriel-Marie Frédéric
Lett, Brig. Sherwood
Lever, Allan Norman
Lévesque, Michèle
Levin, Matthew
Bruce Alexander Levy
Lewis, Stephen H.
Licari, Wilfrid-Guy
Licharson, John Andrew
Lipman, Ted
Livermore, Daniel
Livingston, Frederick Griffiths
Lloyd, Peter
Logie, Robert R.M.
Longmuir, D. Gordon
Loranger, Julie
Lortie, Marc Robert
Lotto, Victor George
Lundy, Anne Christine
Lysyshyn, Ralph

M 
MacCallum, Elizabeth Pauline
MacDermot, Terence William Leighton
MacDonald, Craig Thomas
MacDonald, Hon. David S.H.
Macdonald, Hon. Donald Stovel
Macdonald, James Scott
MacDonald, Melvyn
MacDonald, Thomas
Macdonnell, Ronald Macalister
Mace, Michael T.
Macgillivray, John Charles
MacKay, Robert Alexander
MacKinnon, Philip
MacLachlan, John R.
MacLaren, Hon. Roy
MacLean, Ronald Stuart
MacLellan, Keith William
Macpherson, Marion Adams
Maddick, Harold Morton
Magann, George Loranger
Magee, William Edward
Mahoney, Merchant M.
Mailhot, Normand
Main, J.R.K.
Malone, David
Malone, Joseph Anthony
Malone, Thomas Paul
Mank, Randolph
Mann, Richard
Marchand, Daniel
Marchand, de Montigny
Marchand, Louise R.
Marchi, Hon. Sergio
Marcoux, Serge
Marler, Hon. Sir Herbert Meredith
Marr, Thomas
Marsden-Dole, Patricia M.
Marshall, Charles Jordan
Martin, Hon. Joseph James Guillaume Paul
Massey, Hon. Vincent
Massip, Marie Isabelle
Matheson, Angus James
Mathieu, Gilles
Mathys, François Antoine
Matthews, Wilmot Donald
Mawhinney, Barry Michael
Maybee, John Ryerson
Mayhew, Hon. Robert Wellington
Mayrand, Léon
McAlister, Andrew
McArthur, Archibald Duncan
McAskie, Carolyn M.
McCallion, Kathryn Elizabeth
McCardell, Sandra
McCardle, James Joachim
McCarthy, Hon. Leighton
McCloskey, Jean
McCordick, John Alexander
McCoy, Susan
McCracken, David Stewart
McCue, Douglas
McCullough, Wilfrid Bertram
MacDermot, Terrence William Leighton
McDermott, Dennis
McDougall, Pamela Ann
McDougall, Robert
McDowall, Stuart B.
McGaughey, Charles Eustace
McGill, Allan Sydney
McGreer, Edgar D'Arcy
McIlwraith, Kenneth Douglas
McInnes, Graham Campbell
McKellar, Peter
McKenna, Frank J.
McKinney, James Russell
McLaine, Alan Pittman
McLane, Paul Vernon
McLaren, Robert Wallace
McLennan, Donald P.
McMaster, Donald
McMurtry, Hon. Roland Roy
McNaughton, Gen. Andrew George Latta
McNee, John A.
McPhail, Donald Sutherland
McQueen, Jennifer R.
McRae, Robert
Meagher, Blanche Margaret
Meech, Frederick Martyn
Menzies, Arthur Redpath
Meunier, Marie-Bernard
Meyer, Paul
Michener, Hon. Daniel Roland
Middleton, Robert Morrice
Midwinter, James Robert
Miller, David Miles
Mitchell, Robert Henry Graham
Moher, Mark
Molgat, Daniel Albert Bernard
Molloy, Michael J.
Montgomery, William Harp
Moore, Victor Campbell
Moran, Herbert Owen
Morantz, Aubrey Lawrence
Moreau, Martine
Morin, Jean
Morin, Marie-Lucie
Mosser, Mary
Moszczenska, Marta
Mukhopadhyay, Audri
Mullin, Scott J.
Mulroney, David
Mundy, John
Munro, Donald Wallace
Murison, Michael William
Murray, Rosaline

N 
Nadeau, Jean
Nelson, John Howard
Newton, Theodore Francis Moorhouse
Noble, John
Noble, Kenneth Frederick
Noble, Robert
Noiseux, Jacques
Norman, Egerton Herbert
Norman, Henry Gordon
Normandin, Henri-Paul
Northgrave, Brian
Nutt, Jim Sutcliffe
Nutting, Sinclair Holmes

O 
Oak, Brian
Odlum, Maj.-Gen. Victor Wentworth
Olivier, William George Marcel
O'Neill, Jacqueline 
Ouellette, J. André
Ouimet, Louise

P 
Pacaud, Lucien Turcotte
Pagé, Martial
Palmer, Frederic Herbert
Panneton, Philippe
Pardy, Henry G.
Parent, Hon. Gilbert
Parisot, Patrick
Patterson, George Sutton
Payne, Julian H.
Paynter, John Lawrence
Pearson, Geoffrey A.H.
Pearson, Lester Bowles
Peck, Robert
Pedersen, Robert E.
Peel, Hugh David
Pelletier, Hon. Gérard
Perley, Hon. Sir George Halsey
Perrault, Michel
Perron, Arthur C.
Perron, Marc
Pflanz, Benno Theodore
Phillips, Michael B.
Picard, Bruno
Picard, Louis Phillippe
Pick, Alfred John
Pierce, Sydney David
Pillarella, Franco
Pinnacle, Trevor John
Poisson, Louis
Poole, J. Christopher
Pope, Lt.-Gen. Maurice Arthur
Pope, Thomas Maurice du Monceau
Pottie, Donica
Potvin, André Réal
Poulin, Claire
Pouliot, François P.
Power, Noble Edward Charles
Preston, David
Puxley, Evelyn

R 
Rae, Saul Forbes
Rankin, Bruce Irving
Rau, Gerald Anthony
Raymond, Valerie
Reading, Paul
Reece, David Chalmer
Reeder, Neil
Reedie, Penny
Reid, Escott Meredith
Renaud, Paul Émile
Rettie, Edward Rose
Reynolds, Ralph Edward
Rezek, Gustav Gad
Richardson, Barbara
Riddell, Gordon George
Riddell, Robert Gerald
Riddell, Walter Alexander
Rioux, Georges
Rishchynski, Guillermo
Ritchie, Albert Edgar
Ritchie, Charles Stewart Almon
Rive, Alfred
Robbins, John Everett
Roberts, James Alan
Roberts, Peter McLaren
Robertson, Angus Waldron John
Robertson, Norman Alexander
Robinson, Andrew
Robinson, John
Rochon, Robert J.
Rock, Allan
Roger, Allan Barclay
Rogers, Evan Benjamin
Rogers, Robert Louis
Rohringer, Leslie Andrew Michael
Ronning, Chester Alvin
Rose, John David Logan
Ross, Andrew Donald
Ross, C. William
Rousseau, Charles Odilon Roger
Rousseau, Hugues
Roy, Isabelle
Roy, Jacques Silva
Roy, Joseph Raymond
Roy, Lionel Victor Joseph
Roy, Michel
Roy, Hon. Philippe
Rufelds, Carl Ernest
Russel, Colin

S 
Saint-Martin, Jean-Guy Joseph Bernard
Saint-Pierre, Claude Jean
Sarafian, Haig Edouard
Savaria, Jules
Schioler, John Pontoppidan
Schram, John
Schreyer, Rt. Hon. Edward Richard
Schumacher, Brian
Schwarzmann, Maurice
Schemmer, Darren
Schwenger, Carl
Scott, Harry Albert
Scott, Jon J.
Scott, Seaman Morley
Scrimshaw, Sandelle D.
Seaborn, James Blair
Serafini, Shirley
Seymour, George Wesley
Shaikh, Zaib
Shannon, George James
Shannon, Gerald Edward
Sheehan, Terrence Bernard
Shenstone, Michael
Sherwood, Arthur Percy
Shortliffe, Glen Scott
Sigurdson, Konrad
Sigvaldason, John Peter
Simard, André S.
Simard, Jacques T.
Simard-Andujar, Hélène
Simon, Mary
Sinclair, Donald
Sinclair, Jill
Sinclair, William E.
Singleton, Howard Barham
Sirrs, Robert Douglas
Skinner, Gerald R.
Skok, Margaret
Small, Albert Douglas
Small, Charles John
Small, Michael
Smith, Arnold Cantwell
Smith, Donald W.
Smith, Gary J.
Smith, Gordon Scott
Smith, Lawrence Austin Hayne
Smith, Robert Guy Carrington
Smith, Baron Strathcona and Mount Royal, Hon. Sir Donald Alexander
Snider, Dennis
Somerville, Philip
Southam, Gordon Hamilton
Spector, Norman
Sproule, David
St. Jacques, Guy
Stanford, Joseph Stephen
Stansfield, David
Starnes, John Kennett
Steers, Barry Connell
Steidle, Doreen
Stephens, Llewellyn Aikins Douglas
Stephenson, Donald
Stewart, Allan
Stewart, Gavin Hugh
Stiles, John Alexander
Stiles, Nancy M.
Stirk, Jillian
Stockwell, David M.
Stone, James Howard
Stone, Thomas Archibald
Stone, William Frank
Stovel, Jeanette
Strauss, Howard
Strong, James Alexander
Sullivan, Alan William
Summers, David
Summers, George Bernard
Sunquist, Kenneth
Sutherland, Peter
Swords, Colleen
Jon-Michel Sullivan
Sylvain, Carmen

T 
Tait, Richard Marcus
Tanguay, J. Fernand
Tanguay, Pierre
Taylor, James Hutchings
Taylor, Kenneth D.
Taylor, Lewis James
Teakles, John McLaurin
Temple, Michael Charles
Têtu, Richard
Théberge, Paul Arthur
Theodore, Nadia 
Thibault, Denis
Thibault, J.E.
Thomas, John Maldwyn Turner
Thomson, Christopher
Thomson, Robert Key
Timmerman, John
Touchette, Jean-Marcel
Tovell, Freeman Massey
Towe, Peter Milburn
Tregaskes, Stuart Gerald
Treleaven, John
Tremblay, Paul
Tremblay, Pierre
Trottier, Pierre L.
Tupper, Bart., Hon. Sir Charles Hibbert
Turcotte, Edmond
Turgeon, Hon. William Ferdinand Alphonse
Turner, Vernon George

U

V 
Vaillancourt, Joseph Jacques Janvier Émile
Valaskakis, Kimon
Valentine, George Douglas
Valle, Claudio
van Beselaere, Duane
Van Tighem, Clarence Joseph
Vandenhoff, Mary Elizabeth
Vanderloo, Robert
Vanier, Brig. George Philias
Venner, Gordon E.
Vincent, Anthony
Virtue, Alan
Viveash, David
von Finckenstein, Ottfried
von Nostitz, Manfred Gustav

W 
Wadds, Jean Casselman
Wade, Simon
Wadsworth, Michael A.
Wainman-Wood, Thomas Blake Burrill
Wales, Robert L.
Walker, Peter F.
Wall, James
Wang, Erik Benkestock
Warden, William Thomas
Wardroper, Wilfrid Kenneth
Warren, Jack Hamilton
Watkins, John Benjamin Clark
Webster, Clifford Johnston
Weekes, John
Welsh, Michael
Wershof, Max Hirsch
Westdal, Christopher William
Weynerowski, Witold Maciej
Wheeler, Stewart
Whiting, Shelley
Whittleton, Jack Alexander
Wielgosz, Renata
Wilgress, Leolyn Dana
Williams, Bruce MacGillivray (-2005)
Williams, Timothy Angus
Williamson, Kenneth Bryce
Wilson, Gardiner
Wilson, Michael
Winfield, David John Sydney
Wood, Francis Ian
Wood, William McKenzie
Woodford, Edward Henry
Woodsworth, Charles James
Woolham, Robert Gordon
Wright, Arthur Robert
Wright, David
Wright, James R.
Wright, Robert A.
Wright, Robert G.
Wrong, Humphrey Hume

Y 
Yalden, Maxwell Freeman

Z 
Zawisza, John M.A.
Zukowsky, Janet P.

References

External links
 Canadian Heads of Posts Abroad from 1880

 
Diplomats
Diplomats
 
Diplomats